William Byngham (also William Bingham) (c. 1390 – 17 November 1451) was the founder of the first secondary school training college in Britain.

Byngham became vicar of St John Zachary in the City of London on 25 May 1424, where, along with other prominent clergy such as Worthyngton St Andrew, Holborn, Lychefield (St Mary Magdalene, Old Fish Street) and Cote (St Peter-upon-Cornhill), he petitioned wealthy aldermen, and indeed the King himself, to restore the grammar schools. The foundation of God's House  in Cambridge in 1437 (with financial backing from a former Lord Mayor of London John Brokley) should have been a triumphant conclusion to his long campaign, but it took a further decade before his foundation was finally given the royal seal of approval.

Notes

1390s births
1451 deaths
15th-century English Roman Catholic priests
History of education in England